Liudmila Dmitriyevna Samsonova (born 11 November 1998) is a Russian tennis player. She also competed for Italy from 2014 to 2018. Samsonova has a career-high WTA rankings of No. 12 in singles and 59 in doubles, both achieved on 27 February 2023.

She won her first WTA Tour title at the 2021 German Open, a WTA 500 title, and has overall won four singles titles and one doubles title on the WTA Tour. She has also won a total of six titles on the ITF Circuit. At the 2020–21 Billie Jean King Cup, Samsonova led the Russian team to their first triumph since 2008, winning all five of her matches in both singles and doubles.

Early life
Samsonova was born 11 November 1998 in the industrial city of Olenegorsk, Murmansk Oblast, Russia. Their family moved with the then-one-year-old Liudmila to Italy. Her father Dmitry, a table tennis player, was invited to play for the club Ferentino based in Torino. Her father urged her to start playing either table tennis or lawn tennis, choosing the latter. She started playing tennis at the age of six, joining Riccardo Piatti's tennis academy in Sanremo after the local tennis federation helped her financially with that. Until 2018, Liudmila represented Italy in professional tennis, before switching to the Russian flag.

In July 2021, she explained the reason behind her decision was the extra pressure of competing for the Italian national team, a country where tennis is more followed than in Russia where she feels like competing only for herself, especially considering her "boom boom" hard-hitting game style. Russian sources were more specific about all the reasons behind the unusual switch after turning 18 in the light of significant amount of local players switching from the Russian flag. According to the Tennis Weekend, Samsonova faced problems while trying to obtain an Italian passport and there was a certain shortage of support for her as an immigrant from the Italian Tennis Federation. She keeps practicing outside of Russia, as she is unsatisfied with the condition for professional tennis provided by the Russian Tennis Federation domestically. In October 2021, Samsonova clarified she has never had an Italian citizenship and thus has never faced the option of choosing between the two flags.

Liudmila admitted that if her parents had stayed in Russia she would have chosen figure skating. She speaks Italian as a native language and English as her second one, and her Russian is surprisingly good considering a lack of practice.

Professional career

Junior years
Samsonova reached her highest ITF junior ranking on 18 July 2016, peaking at the 65th spot on the rankings. Her biggest achievements were winning consecutive ITF Junior Circuit Grade 2 tournaments in 2016, defeating notable players such as Kaja Juvan and Marta Kostyuk.

2013–2016: ITF debut and first titles
In 2013, Samsonova made her professional debut at consecutive ITF Circuit tournaments in Umag, but lost both her singles matches.

2014 saw Samsonova winning her first ITF title at a $10k event in Rome, beating three seeded players to clinch the victory despite being unranked. The win allowed her debuting on the WTA rankings, at the 960th spot.

The upcoming two years saw the Russian struggle on the ITF Circuit, amassing an 11–12 win–loss record which caused her ranking to stagnate outside the best 1000 players. Nonetheless, she managed to return to the top 1000 towards the end of 2016, after reaching the final of an $10k event in Solarino.

2017–2018: Breakthrough on the ITF Circuit
Samsonova's first real breakthrough came when she was leaving her teenage years. Reaching three $15k finals in Hammamet, Pula and Mâcon in 2017, respectively, the Russian almost halved her ranking and ended the year ranked 552nd.

2018 was another decent year for Samsonova, having reached a total of four finals. Overriding her personal best results, the Russian won her first $25k title at the Open Castilla y León, stunning third seed Başak Eraydın in the final with the loss of just two games.

Samsonova caused a huge shock at the Open de Saint-Malo, a $60k event, coming through three rounds of qualifying to lift the biggest title of her career and breaking the top 200 for the first time in her career. Her 40–21 win–loss record helped Samsonova end the year inside the top 200 for the first time.

2019: WTA Tour & Grand Slam & top 150 debut 

Samsonova started the year with her Grand Slam debut at the Australian Open, but was defeated in the second qualifying round by Karolína Muchová. Choosing to compete in higher-level WTA tournaments with her ranking, the Russian fell in the qualifying rounds of Premier tournaments in St. Petersburg, Doha and Dubai.

After a five-match losing streak to start the clay-court season, Samsonova stunned several higher-ranked players, including tenth seed Marie Bouzková, to qualify for the main draw at the French Open on her first attempt. Despite losing in the first round to 23rd seed Donna Vekić, she reached a new career-high ranking of world No. 153, on 10 June 2019 after the tournament.

Reaching her second WTA Tour main draw at the rain-plagued Nottingham Open, Samsonova continued her good run of form before falling to former top-15 player Yanina Wickmayer in the final round of qualifying at the Wimbledon Championships, on her debut.

Samsonova received her first direct entry into a WTA Tour main draw at the Ladies Open Lausanne, but lost to lucky loser Han Xinyun in the second round. In the following week, despite losing to Amandine Hesse in the final qualifying round of the Palermo Ladies Open, she received an entry into the main draw by virtue of an emptied lucky-loser spot. There, she stunned fourth seed and 56th-ranked Tamara Zidanšek, in straight sets, before hitting 41 winners to beat Lausanne champion Fiona Ferro in the quarterfinals to make her first WTA semifinal. However, she ran out of steam as she was defeated by eventual champion Jil Teichmann, in straight sets.

Choosing not to defend her title in Saint-Malo, her ranking dipped from 131 to 163 in September, but qualifying for the main draw at the Tashkent Open allowed her to improve her ranking. Going into the ITF Poitiers, an $80k event, unseeded and looming, Samsonova strolled into the final without losing a set but lost to rising star Nina Stojanović, in straight sets. Her good run continued at the WTA 125 Open de Limoges, where she reached the quarterfinals by beating top-100 players Camila Giorgi and Alizé Cornet.

She ended the year with a 32–27 win–loss record with an impressive nine top-100 wins, partly due to competing in more WTA tournaments and facing tougher draws in the process.

2020: Steady presence on the WTA Tour
Starting the year at the Premier-level Brisbane International, Samsonova survived the qualifying rounds which included a straight-sets win over Kristina Mladenovic. Drawing former US Open champion Sloane Stephens in the first round of the main draw, she clinched the best win of her career by beating the American in three sets, serving ten aces in the process and blasting countless winners with her "fearless aggression". Although she was defeated by world No. 7, Petra Kvitová, in the second round, Samsonova headed to the Australian Open with a new career-high ranking of No. 118.

Beating Wang Xiyu in the final qualifying round, Samsonova qualified for the main draw in Melbourne for the first time in her career. Drawing former French Open champion, Jeļena Ostapenko, in the first round, she was outpowered and committed 24 unforced errors en route a straight-sets defeat. In the match, Samsonova also set the record of hitting the fastest serve on the women's side throughout the entire tournament in 2020.

Heading back to Russia for the St. Petersburg Ladies' Trophy, she qualified for the main draw but fell to fellow Russian Anastasia Potapova in the first round. Similar to 2019, Samsonova failed to qualify for the main draw at the Qatar Open and the Dubai Tennis Championships before the COVID-19 pandemic forced the tour to go on a hiatus for a couple of months.

With the tour resuming at the Palermo Ladies Open, Samsonova took part in the qualifying rounds and defeated Marta Kostyuk for the second time this year en route qualifying for the main draw. Defeating Kirsten Flipkens in the first round, and exacting revenge for her two losses to the Belgian in 2019, Samsonova set up an interesting clash with top seed Petra Martić. Despite leading by a set, Samsonova was unable to beat the Croatian, who ultimately reached semifinals.

Samsonova lost in the first round of both of the US Open and French Open to the resurgent Tsvetana Pironkova and eventual finalist Sofia Kenin respectively. The Russian led Kenin by a break in the final set in her first career match against a top 10 opposition. She ended her year with a runner-up finish at the $25k event in Reims, falling to Océane Dodin in straight sets.

2021: Maiden WTA title, Wimbledon fourth round, top 50 debut

Samsonova began her year at the Australian Open qualifying event, which was held in Dubai due to pandemic-related reasons. She beat the 30th seed, former top-30 player Lesia Tsurenko, in straight sets, to book her ticket to Melbourne for a second successive year. She lost in the opening round of the Yarra Valley Classic, a tune-up event to the Australian Open to Tsvetana Pironkova, but rebounded to earn her first Grand Slam main-draw victory over Paula Badosa, recovering from 3–5 down in the final set to triumph. Her run ended in the second round, in the hands of world No. 14, Garbiñe Muguruza, in straight sets. She ended her trip in Australia with another successful qualifying campaign at the Adelaide International, reaching the main draw and challenging sixth seed Martić to three sets.

Samsonova returned to the tour at the Miami Open, where she qualified for the main draw with consecutive wins. In the first round, she then beat fellow hard-hitting Camila Giorgi, in straight sets. She earned the biggest win of her career over world No. 11, Kiki Bertens, after losing just three games, reaching the third round of a WTA 1000 event for the first time in her career. Samsonova lost to Maria Sakkari eventually.

Samsonova then began her clay-court campaign at the Charleston Open and MUSC Health Women's Open, held at the same venue in consecutive weeks. She suffered early losses to Coco Gauff and Clara Tauson in both tournaments, respectively. As a lucky loser, Samsonova reached the second round of the Emilia-Romagna Open, before being defeated by Martic once again. She then suffered a shock loss in the first round of qualifying at the French Open, losing to Aleksandra Krunić in three sets.

Beginning her first career grass-court season at the German Open in Berlin, starting as a qualifier, she reached her first WTA Tour final. Her campaign began with a tight win over Ana Konjuh in a final-set tiebreak to qualify for the main draw, before stunning Markéta Vondroušová in the first round. Samsonova then reached her first WTA 500 quarterfinal with a straight-sets defeat of compatriot Veronika Kudermetova, not facing a break point throughout the encounter. Samsonova then prevailed 7–6, 2–6, 7–6 over former top-10 player Madison Keys, saving 8/11 break points in the match, and followed it up with a bigger upset over two-time Grand Slam champion Victoria Azarenka in the semifinal. In the final, she upset world No. 12, Belinda Bencic, from a set down to win her maiden WTA tournament title. With this run she climbed 43 spots to reach a career-high ranking of world No. 63, on 21 June 2021.

By virtue of her Berlin run, she also received a wildcard into the main draw of Wimbledon, making her debut in the main draw. There, she rode on her momentum and reached the fourth round of a Grand Slam for the first time in her career after defeating the giant-killing Kaia Kanepi, 22nd seed Jessica Pegula and former Grand Slam champion Sloane Stephens in three sets. In her first appearance in the second week of a major, she lost to eventual finalist Karolína Plíšková in straight sets. Following this best run in her career, she made her top 60 debut.

Contesting the main draws of the Canadian Open and the Western and Southern Open for the first time in her career, Samsonova recorded a good win over top-20 player Elena Rybakina but lost to Sara Sorribes Tormo and Victoria Azarenka, respectively. Samsonova won her first main-draw match at the US Open over Katie Boulter.

Samsonova, seeded seventh at the Luxembourg Open, defeated Misaki Doi and Océane Dodin to reach her first quarterfinal since Berlin. There, she stunned the top seed Bencic once again, prevailing in straight sets. She lost to Jeļena Ostapenko in the semifinals, but reached another new career-high ranking after the tournament. Samsonova made her main-draw debut at the Indian Wells Open, triumphing over Kateryna Kozlova in the first round, but fell to compatriot Kudermetova in the second round.

She lost to Ajla Tomljanović in the first round of the Kremlin Cup. Samsonova then reached the semifinals of the Courmayeur Ladies Open but lost to Tauson once again, this time after having five match points. Nonetheless, she managed to make her top 40 debut after the tournament. She ended season at the BJK Cup Finals, making her debut in the tournament but played a pivotal role in clinching the title for Russia as she went unbeaten throughout the week. She clinched singles wins over Sloane Stephens and Belinda Bencic and extended her head-to-head record against both players to 3–0. She also partnered Veronika Kudermetova and won all six sets they contested, defeating Canada, France and the United States.

2022: WTA 1000 & US Open fourth rounds, top 20, three titles
Samsonova began her season at the Melbourne Summer Set 1 but suffered a first-round defeat to former top-10 player Andrea Petkovic. The Russian reached her first quarterfinal of the season at the Adelaide International 2 but lost to Madison Keys. At the Australian Open, Samsonova beat qualifier Emina Bektas in the first round, reaching the second round for the second consecutive year.

She lost in the qualifying rounds of the Dubai Tennis Championships before falling to Alizé Cornet in the first round of the Qatar Ladies Open, in a three-set match.

Nonetheless, she found form at the Indian Wells Open where she made the fourth round of a WTA 1000 event for the first time in her career. However, she lost to Petra Martić in the fourth round in their fourth consecutive meeting.

She reached the top 25 on 9 May 2022 after a semifinal showing at the Stuttgart Grand Prix where she lost to top seed Iga Swiatek. She lost in the first rounds at both WTA 1000 tournaments: the Madrid Open and the Italian Open. At the French Open, she lost also in the first round, to Danka Kovinić.

During the American Tour, Samsonova collected two back-to-back titles. First, she played at the Washington Open, and won five matches including a second-round win over top 10 Emma Raducanu. In the final she defeated Kaia Kanepi after losing the first set. Her next stop was supposed to be Canadian Open qualifying but she was forced to withdrawal due to still playing at Washington D.C. She then played at the Tennis in the Land tournament in Cleveland. Beating Aliaksandra Sasnovich in the final, she won her second title of the year and recorded her tenth consecutive win.

At the US Open, she reached the fourth round for the first time at this major defeating qualifier Sara Bejlek, 14th seed Leylah Fernandez, and Aleksandra Krunić. In the fourth round, she lost to Ajla Tomljanović, after losing an intense one hour first set battle, losing eight set points and a 20 minute game.

In Tokyo, she defeated Elena Rybakina, Wang Xinyu, third seed Garbiñe Muguruza, and Zhang Shuai to reached her third final of the season. In the final, she beat first-time finalist Zheng Qinwen to win her fourth career WTA title. However, she lost in the first round of San Diego Open to Bianca Andreescu in three sets. In Guadalajara,  she defeated Aryna Sabalenka in the second round for her first Top 5 win before losing to Marie Bouzková in three sets. With this result, she made her top 20 debut on October 24 in WTA rankings.

2023: Top 15 debut in singles, top 60 in doubles
Samsonova began her season at the Adelaide International 1 as she sweeped past Zhang Shuai for her first win of the year. She lost in the second round to eventual champion Aryna Sabalenka in two tiebreaks despite being up 5–1 in the first set. This was followed by a straight-sets loss to Amanda Anisimova in Adelaide 2 first round. Seeded 18th at the Australian Open, she defeated Jasmine Paolini in straight sets before losing to Donna Vekić in the second round, winning only three games. At Dubai, she also won in the first round against Paula Badosa, in the third longest match of the year lasting three hours and 22 minutes. She reached the third round after a walkover from Zheng Qinwen but lost to top seed and world No. 1, Iga Swiatek. At the same tournament with Kudermetova she won the double title. As a result, she made her top 60 debut in doubles.

Billie Jean King Cup
Samsonova has competed for the Russian team since 2021, securing her first nomination at the 2020–21 Billie Jean King Cup Finals where she was the fifth-ranked singles player for Russia. She made her debut in doubles alongside Kudermetova, defeating the pair of world No.5 Gabriela Dabrowski and Rebecca Marino, 6–3, 6–1. Continuing her partnership with Kudermetova, they defeated Clara Burel and Alizé Cornet in 47 minutes to seal a 2–1 win over France, booking their spot in the semifinals. Samsonova was pivotal in Russia's win over the United States as she made her singles debut against Sloane Stephens, coming from a set and multiple break points down to win the first rubber. She then came back alongside Kudermetova to beat Shelby Rogers and CoCo Vandeweghe and seal a spot in the final. In the final, Samsonova continued her unbeaten run, coming in as a late replacement for an injured Pavlyuchenkova to stun Belinda Bencic, once again from a set down, to clinch the title for Russia.

Performance timelines

Only main-draw results in WTA Tour, Grand Slam tournaments, Fed Cup/Billie Jean King Cup and Olympic Games are included in win–loss records.

Singles
Current through the 2023 Dubai Open.

Doubles
Current after the 2023 Dubai Championships.

Significant finals

WTA 1000 finals

Doubles: 1 (title)

WTA career finals

Singles: 5 (4 titles, 1 runner-up)

Doubles: 1 (title)

ITF Circuit finals

Singles: 11 (4 titles, 7 runner–ups)

Doubles: 3 (2 titles, 1 runner–up)

Billie Jean King Cup participation

Singles (2–0)

Doubles (3–0)

WTA Tour career earnings
Current through the 2022 Washington Open.

Career Grand Slam statistics

Seedings
The tournaments won by Samsonova are in boldface, and advanced into finals by Samsonova are in italics.

Head-to-head records

Record against top 10 players

 She has a  record against players who were, at the time the match was played, ranked in the top 10.

Double-bagel matches

Longest winning streak

13-match win streak (2022)

Awards
International
 Billie Jean King Cup Finals:
Most Valuable Player: 2021.
Rookie of the Year: 2021.

National
 The Russian Cup in the nomination: 
Team of the Year: 2021.

Notes

References

External links

 
 
 

1998 births
Living people
Russian emigrants to Italy
Russian expatriate sportspeople in Italy
Russian female tennis players
Italian female tennis players
People from Olenegorsk, Murmansk Oblast
Sportspeople from Murmansk Oblast